The 1979 Men's African Volleyball Championship was in Tripoli, Libya, with 5 teams participating in the continental championship.

Teams

Results

Final ranking

References
 Men Volleyball Africa Championship 1979 Tripoli (LBA)

1979 Men
African championship, Men
African Volleyball Championship
Men's African Volleyball Championship
International volleyball competitions hosted by Libya